The 1960 Copa de Campeones Finals was a football series between Peñarol and Olimpia on June 12 and June 19 of this very year. It was the final of the first staging of the Copa de Campeones de América (known in the modern era as the Copa Libertadores), which would go on to become the premier club competition in South American football and one of the most prestigious competition in the world. Seven teams entered the competition in its first season and, due to the odd number of teams, Olimpia reached the finals having won only one match and playing merely two. Peñarol had dispatched Jorge Wilstermann and needed a playoff to overcome San Lorenzo to reach the finals with the weight of having played five matches.

Alberto Spencer became the first player to score a goal in a final of this tournament. He also became the first person to score two goals on a final series. Juan Vicente Lezcano became the first player to be sent off in the finals when he was given his marching order on the first leg. The final was effectively decided by a late equalizer on the second leg, scored six minutes from full-time by Alberto Spencer, in a volatile and highly charged game in Asunción. The Manyas became the first ever winners of South America's premier club tournament.

Qualified teams

Stadiums

Rules
The final were played over two legs; home and away. The team that accumulated the most points —two for a win, one for a draw, zero for a loss— after the two legs would be crowned the champion. Should the two teams be tied on points after the second leg, the team with the best goal difference would win. If the two teams had equal goal difference, a playoff match at a neutral venue would be contested.

Match details

First leg

|valign="top" width="50%"|

|}

Second leg

|valign="top" width="50%"|

|}

References

External links
CONMEBOL's official website 
Peñarol in Copa Libertadores 1960–1969
1960 Copa Libertadores at Ficha Do Jogo

1
1960
Peñarol matches
Club Olimpia matches
1960 in Uruguayan football
1960
1960 in Paraguayan sport
International association football competitions hosted by Paraguay